https://www.facebook.com/groups/KALANGBAFAMBUL

Kalangba (/kælæŋbæ/)(Loko: Ngangba)  is a rural village in Bombali District, Northern Province, Sierra Leone. It is the headquarters for Ngowahun Chiefdom. It is situated about 15 miles (24 km) northwest of Makeni, the largest city in Sierra Leone's northern region. Kalangba is approximately 134 miles (216 km) north-east of the nation's capital, Freetown. It is a multicultural community. The majority of the inhabitants belong to the Loko ethnic group as well as the Fula and Mandingo. The Loko are the fifth largest ethnic group in Sierra Leone. As of the 2016 census, the population was 3,000.

Etymology of Name 
The name Kalangba has its origin from its founder, a fisherman known as Pa Ngangba. The British colonial administrators could not pronounce Ngangba well and so they called it Kalangba. Pa Ngangba was a member of the Loko tribesmen and used to fish along the waters of Mangwaah, the name of a stream with literal meaning “if we cut ourselves” running through what is today known as Kalangba (or "Ngangba" in Loko). The stream use to have raffia palms and sharp plants that will easily tear into the skin.

Pa Ngangba's comrade Pa Cigolo (Cigolo means “spider” in Loko) settled on the other side of the town now used as a cemetery. A nearby settlement known as “Makambie” founded by a warrior called Kambie was merged with Kalangba.  According to oral tradition, it is believed that the pre-colonial empire ruled by Bai Bureh, the hero of the Hut Tax War of 1898, extended from Kasseh in the Port Loko District to Kalangba. Also oral tradition have mentioned Gumbu Smart as associated with this settlement

The inhabitants are mostly engaged in unsustainable  subsistence livelihood activities - agriculture, fishing and hunting - for sustenance. The town lacks most of the basic needs and services required for a modern settlement. However, Kalangba has a Junior Secondary School, senior secondary school and extension college that offers various diplomas. A Primary health center that serve the community and the peripheral villages. Kalangba has also two elementary schools, one founded by the American Wesleyan Mission in the late forties and the other by the Sierra Leone Muslim Brotherhood in the late seventies.

Kalangba is a very religious community with converts and traditional Christians and Muslims. The town has a majestic structure imposingly located at the center of the town, the Wesleyan Church of Sierra Leone Kalangba with a capacity to host more than five hundred people and Faith Baptist church founded in the early 90s by two brothers Rev. Today Koroma and Rev. Joseph Mojoko Koroma.  There are three Mosques, a court Barry and a market. The town is growing so fast that every Monday there is a Luma where in traders from as far as Makeni and the entire peripheral towns come to trade. Kalangba has become an important trade center with  the newly elected Paramount Chief Kandeh Kpangai III at the hem of affairs.  Also, this chiefdom headquarters of NGowahun has recently seen the mining of lithium, gold and other precious minerals that is believed to generate income and create employment for the citizenry

History 

Present day Kalangba is a merger of three prehistoric settlements - Macigolo on the north east, Mandagai on the south east and Makambi on the west. The Sesays, The Kargbos, The Fornahs and The Koromas had lived in those settlements. It was in the era of the Trans Sahara Trade but up to the end of the Trade in the 17th century, Kalangba was unknown because the Trade in its real time never effectively reached that part of Sierra Leone.

Between the 15th and 18th centuries, there were intertribal conflicts all across West Africa from the Sahel to the coast lines. Much of that was felt in Kalangba with the arrival of a splinter group of the Manes from Mandimansa (Present day Mali) who invaded Sierra Leone in the 16th century led by the great grandfather of the Kamaras, Pa Tegbehun. Pa Tegbehun, known in Ngowahun as the great warrior, established his control over the three settlements in the first half of the 19th century from Gbangbawahun on the south side of Kalangba. At that time the expansion of the British Colony into the protectorate areas of Sierra Leone had just begun. However, Colonial relationship with Kalangba was actually felt during the era of Pa Tegbehun's successor, Yangi Saio, better known as Kandeh Saio II.

Yangi Saio came to power during the spread of Islam in West Africa. It was during the time of Yangi Saio the great Muslim cleric and prominent business man, Pa Alhaji Saccoh, arrived. It was also during the time of Yangi Saio the three settlements were merged. The American missionaries from Oklahoma who had been in Sierra Leone since the late 1800s also came to Kalangba during that period.

Between the era of Yangi Saio and Kandeh Saio III, power shifted to Gbendembu for a while within the context of amalgamation of two chiefdoms; namely, Gbendembu Chiefdom and Ngowahun Chiefdom. By the time Kandeh Saio III came to power, Kalangba had grown into a multicultural settlement. There were the Lokos, the Mandingoes, the Susu, the Fula, the Wolof, etc. The multiculturalism and increase in population was sped with the construction of road between Makeni and Kamakwei and establishment of the ferry system on the Mabole River in the early 20th century.

Infrastructure 
The source of the water supply in Kalangba is underground water wells. There is no modern sewerage system.

Residents rely on generators for power as the village has no electrical grid.

Education

Primary schools

 The Wesleyan Elementary School founded in the 1940s by the American Wesleyan Mission of Fort Wayne, Indiana.
 The Muslim Brotherhood Elementary School established in the 1970s.

Secondary schools
 Kalangba Junior Secondary School a middle school.
 Kalangba Senior Secondary School was under construction.

Notable people
 Dr. Shekuba Saccoh was born in Kalangba, Ngowahun Chiefdom. He was a diplomat and a politician.
 Brigadier John Amadu Bangura, CBE was born in Tambiama, Ngowahun Chiefdom. He was a former Governor-General of Sierra Leone.
 Frank Benjamin Kamara educator and author of Black Diamond from Sierra Leone West Africa.
 Gumbu Smart former slave turned abolitionist.
° Rev. Joseph Mojoko Koroma  notable pastor of Faith Wesleyan Church Darby USA, author and humanitarian donating 50,000 dollars of medical books to the college of Medicine and Allied Science Sierra Leone( Concord Times) He is also an 
  educator, philanthropist, educator, entrepreneur, Nurse practitioner and author(Spiritual warfare: Greatest controversy- exposing the operations of the kingdom of darkness- 2022( https://www.amazon.com/Spiritual-Warfare-Operations-
  Darkness-Overcoming/dp/1956630120/ref=sr_1_85?crid=3LTBGURKG22FS&keywords=spiritual+warfare&qid=1669188248&sprefix=%2Caps%2C47&sr=8-85
. Kandeh Saio III Paramount chief from 1964- 2009
Kandeh Kpangah III current PC from June 2022 to present
Umaru Bounson- Philanthropist

References

Populated places in Sierra Leone
Northern Province, Sierra Leone
Spiritual Warfare: Exposing the Operations of the Kingdom of Darkness- Overcoming the Powers of the Enemy Paperback – October 27, 2022 amazon